Chris Flory (born November 13, 1953) is an American jazz guitarist.

Flory began playing professionally in Providence, Rhode Island, in the 1970s. He played with Benny Goodman from 1979 to 1985, toured throughout China in 1992, and among his other credits include work with Ruby Braff, Judy Carmichael, Roy Eldridge, Scott Hamilton, Illinois Jacquet, Buddy Tate, and Bob Wilber.

In an interview with JazzTimes, Flory stated that his music has been inspired by Charlie Parker, Charlie Christian, T-Bone Walker, and Jimi Hendrix.

Discography

As leader
 For All We Know (Concord Jazz, 1990)
 City Life (Concord Jazz, 1993)
 Word on the Street (Double-Time, 1996)
 Blues in My Heart with Duke Robillard (Stony Plain, 2007)
 For You (Arbors, 2008)
 The Chris Flory Quintet Featuring Scott Hamilton (Arbors, 2011)

As sideman
With Ruby Braff
 A First (Concord Jazz, 1985)
 A Sailboat in the Moonlight (Concord Jazz, 1986)
 Mr. Braff to You (Phontastic, 1986)

With Scott Hamilton
 Scott Hamilton and Warren Vache with Scott's Band in New York City (Concord Jazz, 1978)
 Skyscrapers (Concord Jazz, 1980)
 Close Up (Concord Jazz, 1982)
 In Concert (Concord Jazz, 1983)
 The Second Set (Concord, 1984)
 The Right Time (Concord Jazz, 1987)
 Plays Ballads (Concord Jazz, 1989)

With Maxine Sullivan
 Uptown (Concord Jazz, 1985)
 Together (Atlantic, 1987)
 Swingin' Sweet (Concord Jazz, 1988)

With Bob Wilber
 Bob Wilber and the Scott Hamilton Quartet (Chiaroscuro, 1977)
 Dizzyfingers (Bodeswell, 1980)
 Bob Wilber and the Bechet Legacy (Bodeswell, 1981)

With others
 Harry Allen & Keith Ingham, The Intimacy of the Blues (Progressive, 1994)
 Harry Allen & Keith Ingham, My Little Brown Book (Progressive, 1994)
 Judy Carmichael, Trio (C&D, 1989)
 Doc Cheatham, Nonette Rare in Rehearsal (Squatty Roo, 2016)
 Buck Clayton, A Swingin' Dream (Stash, 1989)
 Rosemary Clooney, Sings the Music of Irving Berlin (Concord Jazz, 1984)
 Peter Ecklund, Strings Attached (Arbors, 1996)
 Susannah McCorkle, Thanks for the Memory (Pausa, 1984)
 Ben Paterson, That Old Feeling (Cellar Live, 2018)
 Flip Phillips, A Sound Investment (Concord Jazz, 1987)
 Flip Phillips, The Claw: Live at the Floating Jazz Festival (Chiaroscuro, 1991)
 Duke Robillard, Swing (Rounder, 1987)
 Loren Schoenberg, Time Waits for No One (Musicmasters, 1987)

References

1953 births
Living people
American jazz guitarists
Guitarists from New York (state)
American male guitarists
20th-century American guitarists
20th-century American male musicians
American male jazz musicians
Double-Time Records artists
Stony Plain Records artists
Concord Records artists
Arbors Records artists